Bohadschia marmorata, commonly known as the brown sandfish or chalky cucumber, is a species of sea cucumber in the family Holothuriidae. It lives on the seabed in shallow waters in the Indo-Pacific region.

Description
The body wall is tough and leathery and has a rough texture due to the calcareous spicules it contains. The anterior end of the body is somewhat narrowed and has a mouth surrounded by a ring of retractile tentacles. The posterior end is rounded and has an anal opening. Adjoining this is the cloaca through which defensive white sticky threads, the cuvierian tubules, may be ejected when the animal is stressed. The cloaca is also connected to the respiratory tree, into and out of which water is pumped for gas exchange. The body colour is cream or orange partially obscured by variable numbers of dark brown speckles and blotches. On the underside is a wide pale-coloured longitudinal stripe and many short, slender tube feet with knobbly tips.

Distribution and habitat
Bohadschia marmorata is found in the Indo-Pacific Ocean. The range extends from the Red Sea and east coast of Africa to Japan, the Philippines and Australia. It is often semi-submerged in the sand.

Biology
Bohadschia marmorata is a detritivore. It uses its tube feet to move around and scoops sand, mud and debris into its mouth with its oral tentacles. Having processed this material in its gut, it voids the remains, leaving a characteristic trail of sand on the seabed.

References

External links
 

Holothuriidae
Fauna of the Indian Ocean
Fauna of the Pacific Ocean
Animals described in 1833